Pussysoul is the debut studio album from death metal band, Soilent Green. It is the band's first and last album released through Los Angeles based record label Dwell Records. In 2005 Pussysoul was re-mastered and reissued through Dwell Records.

Track listing
"Thirteen Days a Weak" - 4:37
"Slapfuck" - 3:31
"Falling from a 65 Story Building" - 3:27
"Lips as So of Blood" - 4:03
"The Wrong of Way" - 3:55
"Needlescrape" - 6:04
"Zebra Zombies" - 3:04
"Keep Crawling" - 5:05
"Twitch of an Eye" - 4:09
"Golfers Just Love Punishment" - 5:02
"Love None" - 0:51
"Branding of Thieves" - 3:28

Personnel
Ben Falgoust II - vocals
Brian Patton - lead guitar
Donovan Punch - rhythm guitar
Scott Williams - bass
Tommy Buckley - drums

References

1995 debut albums
Soilent Green albums